The southern mountain cavy (Microcavia australis) is a species of South American rodent in the family Caviidae.

Description
Southern mountain cavies are tailless rodents with short, speckled, greyish-yellow fur, fading to pale grey on the underparts. They have large eyes surrounded by a prominent white ring, and small rounded ears. Females have four teats.

Distribution and habitat
Southern mountain cavies are largely restricted to Argentina, but may also be found in some neighbouring regions of Chile and Bolivia. They are found across almost the whole of western and southern Argentina, where they inhabit arid and semiarid lowlands, often close to rivers or in areas dominated by thorn bushes. Three subspecies are currently recognised:

 M. australis australis - central western to southern Argentina, from San Juan to Santa Cruz, and parts of south-eastern Chile
 M. australis maenas - northwest Argentina, from Jujuy to La Rioja, and extreme southern Bolivia
 M. australis salinia - western Argentina, from Catamarca and Santiago del Estero to Córdoba

Biology and behaviour
Southern mountain cavies eat leaves, fruits and other plant material, with mesquite and Capparis being reported as particularly common foods. In time of hardship, however, they will eat almost any plants, for example gnawing on the bark of creosote bushes.

They live in colonial burrows with anything from 4 to 38 individuals. They are diurnal, emerging from the burrows at sunrise, and remaining active throughout the day, except in particularly hot weather. Males are often aggressive towards one another, creating a strict dominance hierarchy within the burrow. Nonetheless, in severe weather or when there are few shelter sites, individuals, especially females, may huddle together, and the females have also been seen to nurse young cooperatively.

Natural predators include owls, hawks, grisons, foxes, and skunks, and southern mountain cavies alert one another of danger with low-pitched alarm calls. Other calls include a high-pitched cry of fear and soft, almost inaudible, squeaks used during chases and courtship.

Breeding occurs between August and April, with litters of one to five young being born about 54 days later. They are weaned at around three weeks, and females may be sexually mature at just 40 to 50 days old.

References

Cavies
Mammals described in 1833
Mammals of Patagonia
Mammals of the Andes
Mammals of Argentina
Mammals of Bolivia
Mammals of Chile
Taxonomy articles created by Polbot